The R139 road is a regional road in Ireland, located in the east of Dublin.

Route
The official description of the R139 from the Roads Act 1993 (Classification of Regional Roads) Order 2012  reads:

R139: Clonshaugh — Baldoyle, Dublin (Part of old National Route 32)
Between its junction with M50 link road at Clonshaugh Road in the county of Fingal and its junction with R106 at Main Street Baldoyle in the county of Fingal via Belcamp Lane, Clare Hall Avenue and Grange Road in the city of Dublin: Grange Road and Willie Nolan Road in the county of Fingal.

References

Regional roads in the Republic of Ireland
Roads in County Dublin